William John Wedlock (28 October 1880 – 25 January 1965), also known as "Fatty" or the "India Rubber Man", was a footballer who played for Bristol City in 1900–01 and from 1905 until his retirement in 1921. Between 1901 and 1905 he played for Aberdare. He was a centre-half whose his short and stout stature belied his natural talent. He won 26 England caps between 1907 and 1914, his only rival for the centre-half position being Charlie Roberts of Manchester United, his opposite number in the 1909 FA Cup Final. The East End at Ashton Gate Stadium was named the Wedlock Stand in his honour, before being demolished in 2014 as part of the Ashton Gate Stadium redevelopment. Wedlock's pub (now demolished) opposite the ground was where he lived and worked for 43 years. Folk singer Fred Wedlock was Billy's grandson.

Honours
Bristol City
Football League Second Division: 1905–06
Football League First Division runner-up: 1906–07
FA Cup runner-up: 1909

Notes

External links

Billy Wedlock Online at billywedlockonline.co.uk

1880 births
1965 deaths
English footballers
England international footballers
Bristol City F.C. players
Footballers from Bristol
English Football League players
English Football League representative players
Association football central defenders
FA Cup Final players